Clifford L. Hilton (December 6, 1866 – April 5, 1946) was an American lawyer.

Born in Kenyon, Minnesota, Hilton moved to Fergus Falls, Minnesota in 1879 and graduated from Fergus Falls High School. He received his law degree from University of Wisconsin Law School and was admitted to the Minnesota and Wisconsin bars. He served as city attorney for Fergus Falls, Minnesota and county attorney for Otter Tail County, Minnesota. He was also Minnesota deputy attorney general. Hilton served as Minnesota Attorney General from 1918 to 1928. Hilton then served on the Minnesota Supreme Court from 1928 to 1943. Hilton died in Florida.

References

1866 births
1946 deaths
People from Fergus Falls, Minnesota
People from Kenyon, Minnesota
University of Wisconsin Law School alumni
Wisconsin lawyers
Minnesota Attorneys General
Justices of the Minnesota Supreme Court